Li Shaochun (4 November 1919 – 21 September 1975) was a Peking opera singer.


Life
Xun's father was one of Peking Opera's "Four Famous Dads" (Sì Dàmíng Diē), along with Xun Huisheng, Tan Xiaopei, and Li Wanchun's fathers.

Li was best known for his "martial"  wǔshēng) and "old man"  lǎoshēng) roles. He served as a mentor to Li Yuru.

References

Citations

Bibliography
 .

External links
 "李少春" on Baike.com 

1919 births
20th-century Chinese male actors
1975 deaths
20th-century Chinese  male singers
Chinese male Peking opera actors
Male actors from Hebei
Musicians from Hebei
People from Bazhou, Hebei